Coesse is an unincorporated town in Union Township, Whitley County, in the U.S. state of Indiana.

History
Coesse was platted in 1854, and was named after Chief Coesse (Kowazi), who was the grandson of Miami Chief Michikinikwa (Little Turtle). A post office was established at Coesse in 1843, and remained in operation until it was discontinued in 1967.

Geography

References

Unincorporated communities in Whitley County, Indiana
Unincorporated communities in Indiana
Fort Wayne, IN Metropolitan Statistical Area